North Dublin Pirates are an American Football team founded in 2015 and are based in the North County Dublin area of Fingal primarily the large suburban town of Swords.
The Club plays in the IAFA affiliated IAFL2 division, The Third Tier of the American Football League system in Ireland.
The Pirates currently play their home games at Malahide Rugby Club.

History 
North Dublin Pirates were formed August 2015 when two former Drogheda Lightning players, Current Head Coach Ross Neville & Former Player/Coach Fergal Waters decided to start a new club after the demise of their former club.

It was decided the club would set up in the North County Dublin area which was a largely untapped area in terms of American Football with a large population. Many names were considered for the team including the Raiders but it was decided the new team would be called the North Dublin Pirates and the new team would apply for a place in the bottom tier of American football in Ireland IAFL2.

Ross Neville assumed the role of Head Coach, Ross was a former Drogheda Lightning Full Back and Head Coach. Ross was Head Coach at the time Drogheda Lightning folded. Coach Neville with help from his Assistant Coaches Kim Wilton-Neville, Fergal Waters & Wayne Sheils successfully gathered a number of players from the Swords & North Dublin area running training at the large public park Newbridge House just outside Swords.

With a small but steadily growing squad assembled by late 2015 the club applied for a place in IAFL2 and was successfully granted entry for the 2016 season.
In early 2016 the club moved its training base to Donaghmede Park, another public space in the north Dublin area of Donaghmede. It was here the squad grew further in size in turn increasing their catchment area and attracting more players from the local area.

The Pirates inaugural season was in 2016.

2016 season 
The North Dublin Pirates played in their first ever game away to the newly formed Wexford Eagles in Gorey.
The Pirates with a small squad of only 16 players fought valiantly against a much larger Eagles squad but ended up on the end of a 34-8 scoreline. The game had to be called near the middle of the 4th Quarter due to a number of injuries to the already decimated Pirates squad.
Team Ireland international player Oisin Dowling scored the very first Touchdown in the club's history with a strong run out wide right.

In their next match the Pirates played their very first Home Game at Malahide Rugby Club against the Galway Warriors. The Pirates started well recovering a fumble on their own 2 Yard line and limiting a strong Warriors drive to just a Field Goal.

The Pirates then scored the first Touchdown of the match when QB Conor Coleman broke on a long run. The Warriors eventually showed their experience and seen the game out 29-6 with a strong second half display.

In the Pirates 3rd Game they again found themselves at home against a team they have a strong relationship with the Derry/Donegal Vipers. The Vipers were a new team that first played in the 2015 IAFL2. The team was helped in its formative stages by current Pirates Coaches Ross Neville, Kim Wilton-Neville & Fergal Waters who donated equipment from Drogheda Lightning after the Club folded and also helped to provide coaching to the newly formed club.
The game took up to moniker of the 'Banter Bowl' due to camaraderie off the field between the two teams and the lighthearted verbal jousting between the two teams respective social media pages.
Again with a much smaller squad the pirates fought hard but were unable to stop the much improved Vipers from a 26-6 win.
Late in the game former Dublin Rebels & West Dublin Rhinos Running Back Robbie Rock scored his first Touchdown for the Pirates with a pounding drive from within the Vipers 10yd line.

In the 4th Game of the season the Pirates traveled to Lisburn, Antrim in Northern Ireland to play against fellow newcomers the PSNI Razorbacks, A team representing the Police force of Northern Ireland. This was viewed as a crucial game as both squads had started the season 0-3 and both sides were evenly matched in terms of size and quality.
The game was played in appalling conditions, a heavy rain feel throughout the game making the pitch very slippery and also made for a heavy running game for both sides.
The Pirates scored through a long run from Oisin Dowling for his second Touchdown of the season. The Pirates held out with an impressive Defensive performance shutting out the Razorbacks Offense. Defensive Lineman James 'Bear' Cannon made an important interception within the Pirates own 20 to prevent the Razorbacks from scoring late on.
The game finished 6-0 to the pirates and resulted in the club's very first victory.

In the 5th and final home game of the season the Pirates took on the Wexford Eagles in the reverse fixture of the first game of the season.
This time much like the first game the Eagles dominated offensively and walked away with a 40-7 victory which left them unbeaten and in a good position for the IAFL2 Bowl game.
The Pirates Touchdown was scored on a long run into the corner by Rookie Josh McDonnell.

In the final game of the season the Pirates made the long journey North West to face the unbeaten Donegal/Derry Vipers in Drumahoe hoping to atone for the defeat earlier in the season against the same opposition and also to cause an upset.
Unfortunately for the Pirates the Vipers powered to a 44-0 victory 
 and secured their place in the IAFL2 Bowl Game against the Wexford Eagles. Which they went on to win a couple of weeks following.

Despite finishing the season 1-5-0 the Pirates showed remarkable progression throughout the 2016 with a squad of only 16 players growing to nearly 30 in number throughout the season.
The team received praise from many opposition coaches on some commendable performances when squad numbers did not stand in their favor with the majority of the squad having to play Ironman Football.

2016 season results

2016 season awards

Defensive MVP
Dave Kiernan & James Cannon

Offensive MVP
Oisin Dowling & Rian Molloy

Rookie of the Year
Aaron Snow

Overall MVP
Josh McDonnell

Clubman of the Year
Liam O'Tailliuir

2017 season

2017 season fixtures/results

Facilities
North Dublin Pirates currently play all home games at Malahide Rugby Club located on the Estuary Road just outside of Swords.

The new 13,500-square-foot (1,250 m2) clubhouse has facilities including two rugby pitches (one floodlit) and use of the adjacent Seabury pitch plus, four changing rooms, a referees changing room.
The clubhouse also has a Rugby Bar and a Function Room suitable for seating over 120 people, kitchen facilities and a conference room capable of holding up to 200 people.

The Pirates currently Train in Donaghmede Park located in Dublin Northside, Dublin 13

Current roster

References

External links
 North Dublin Pirates
 
 [northdublinpirates.blogspot.com]

American football teams in County Dublin

American football teams in the Republic of Ireland
Sports clubs in Fingal
Swords, Dublin
2015 establishments in Ireland
American football teams established in 2015